The 1972 Norwegian Football Cup was the 67th edition of the Norwegian annual knockout football tournament. The Cup was won by Brann after beating Rosenborg in the cup final with the score 1–0. This was Brann's third Norwegian Cup title.

First round

|-
|colspan="3" style="background-color:#97DEFF"|Replay

|}

Second round

|-
|colspan="3" style="background-color:#97DEFF"|Replay

|}

Third round

|colspan="3" style="background-color:#97DEFF"|4 July 1972

|-
|colspan="3" style="background-color:#97DEFF"|5 July 1972

|-
|colspan="3" style="background-color:#97DEFF"|6 July 1972

|-
|colspan="3" style="background-color:#97DEFF"|7 July 1972

|-
|colspan="3" style="background-color:#97DEFF"|9 July 1972

|-
|colspan="3" style="background-color:#97DEFF"|Replay: 13 July 1972

|}

Fourth round

|colspan="3" style="background-color:#97DEFF"|20 August 1972

|-
|colspan="3" style="background-color:#97DEFF"|Replay: 23 August 1972

|}

Quarter-finals

|colspan="3" style="background-color:#97DEFF"|3 September 1972

|}

Semi-finals

|colspan="3" style="background-color:#97DEFF"|11 October 1972

|-
|colspan="3" style="background-color:#97DEFF"|17 October 1972

|}

Final

Brann's winning squad: Oddvar Trææn, Helge Karlsen, Rune Pedersen, Ole Kobbeltvedt, Tore Nordtvedt, Frode Larsen (Torgeir Hauge 60), Erling Mikkelsen (Atle Bilsback 75), Arnfinn Espeseth, Roald Jensen, Kjell Øyasæter and Jan Erik Osland.

Rosenborg's squad: Øivind Brynte Torp, Erling Meirik, Kåre Rønnes, Bjørn Rime, Øystein Wormdal, 
Jan Christiansen, Anders Farstad, Tore Lindseth, Harald Sunde, Bjørn Wirkola and Arne Hanssen.

References
 www.brann.no

External links
http://www.rsssf.no

Norwegian Football Cup seasons
Norway
Football Cup